Sayrakçı, Söke is a village in the District of Söke, Aydın Province, Turkey. As of 2010 it had a population of but 121 people.

References

Villages in Söke District